is a Japanese footballer who plays as a defender for Singapore Premier League club Hougang United.

Club career

Youth
Yamazaki spent a season of his youth career in Germany with SV Darmstadt 98's U-19 team in 2015.

Albirex Niigata (S) 
He signed for Albirex Niigata (S) from Iwaki FC for the 2018 Singapore Premier League. He made his debut for the White Swans in the 2018 Singapore Community Shield, winning his first piece of silverware in the process, after helping his team defeat Tampines Rovers 2–1. In total, he made 44 appearances for Albirex in all competitions, helping them land a domestic treble. At the end of the season, he was one of only four players to be retained by the White Swans.

Yamazaki played well in the 2019 Singapore Premier League season and was called up for the Sultan of Selangor's Cup to represent the Singapore Selection team. At the end of the season, he was also nominated for the Young Player of the Season award.

Home United 
Following his exploits for the White Swans, Yamazaki was snapped up local giants Home United for the 2020 Singapore Premier League season.

Club career statistics
As of 20 Aug 2022

Honours

Albirex Niigata (S) 

 Singapore Premier League: 2018
 Singapore Cup: 2018
 Singapore Community Shield: 2018

References

External links

1995 births
Living people
Japanese footballers
Singapore Premier League players
Albirex Niigata Singapore FC players
Association football forwards
Lion City Sailors FC players